The Tomb of Ibrahim Lodi in Panipat (Haryana, India) is the tomb of Ibrahim Lodi, Sultan of the Lodi dynasty.

Tomb
Ibrahim Lodi's tomb is often mistaken to be the Shisha Gumbad within Lodi Gardens Delhi. Rather Ibrahim Lodi's tomb is actually situated near the tehsil office in Panipat, close to the Dargah of Sufi saint Bu Ali Shah Qalandar. It is a simple rectangular structure on a high platform approached by a flight of steps.

History

Ibrahim Lodi became the Sultan of Delhi in 1517 after 
of his father Sikandar. He was the last ruler of the Lodi dynasty, reigning for nine years between 1517 until being defeated and killed at the battle of Panipat by Babur's invading army in 1526, giving way to the emergence of the Mughal Empire in India.

Ibrahim was an ethnic Pashtun. He attained the throne upon the death of his father, Sikandar, but was not blessed with the same ruling capability. He faced a number of rebellions. The Mewar ruler Rana Sangram Singh extended his empire right up to western Uttar Pradesh and threatened to attack Agra. There was rebellion in the East also. Ibrahim Lodi also displeased the nobility when he replaced old and senior commanders by younger ones who were loyal to him. His Afghan nobility eventually invited Babur to invade India and Rana Sanga invited Babur to invade India, so that Ranga Sanga can rule Delhi.

In 1526, the Mughal forces of Babur, the king of Kabulistan (Kabul, Afghanistan), defeated Ibrahim's much larger army in the Battle of Panipat. Ibrahim was killed during the battle at Panipat and his tomb now lies there.  It is estimated that Babur's forces numbered around 25,000–30,000 men and had between 20 and 24 pieces of field artillery. Ibrahim Lodi had around 30,000–40,000 men along with at least 100 elephants. After the end of Lodi dynasty, the era of Mughal rule commenced.

Restoration and relocation
In 1866, the British relocated the tomb during construction of the Grand Trunk Road and renovated it with an inscription highlighting Ibrahim Lodi's death in the Battle of Panipat.

Another memorial of some kind, however, appears to have existed which used to form a place of pilgrimage for the people of Gwalior since Vikramaditya the last Raja of the old dynasty of Gwalior, fell in the same battle.  This memorial, according to Alexander Cunningham, was destroyed when the Grand Trunk Road was made.

See also

 Tomb of Bahlul Lodi
 Tomb of Sikandar Lodi
 Panipat Places Of Interest
 Lodi Gardens in Delhi
 Humayun's Tomb at Delhi
 Pranpir Badshah tomb at Hisar
 Bu Ali Shah Qalandar at Panipat
 Sheikh Chilli's Tomb at Kurukshetra
 Khwaja Khizr Tomb at Sonipat
 Shah Zia Ud Din Muhammed's tomb at Naraingarh Ambala
 Sheikh Musa's tomb at Nuh
 Shah Nazm al Haq's tomb at Sohna
 Aga Khan Historic Cities Support Programme

References

Architecture of the Lodi dynasty
Sandstone buildings in India
Tourist attractions in Delhi
Mausoleums in Delhi
Landscape design history